The Olympiacos swimming club is a part of the Greek athletic club Olympiacos CFP that trains competitive swimmers.

The swimming club was established in 1925. It has produced athletes who have won numerous Greek championships and several European competitions.  It is open to men, women and young people.

Honours

Greek competitions
 Greek Championship: 63
 1929, 1930, 1931, 1932, 1933, 1934, 1937, 1960, 1961, 1962, 1967, 1969, 1970, 1971, 1972, 1973, 1974, 1975, 1976, 1977, 1978, 1979, 1980, 1981, 1982, 1983, 1984, 1985, 1986, 1988, 1989, 1990, 1991, 1992, 1993, 1994, 1996, 1997, 1998, 1999, 2000, 2001, 2002, 2003, 2004, 2005, 2006, 2007, 2008, 2009, 2010, 2011, 2012, 2013, 2014, 2015, 2016, 2017, 2018, 2019, 2020, 2021, 2022
 Greek Cup of 25m pool: 4
 1997, 1998, 1999, 2001
 Greek Championship Open Water: 9
 2010, 2015,2016,2017, 2018, 2019, 2020, 2021, 2022
 Greek super cup
 2015
 Championship Masters
 2017
 Winter Greek Championship: 32
 1980, 1981, 1982, 1983, 1984, 1985, 1986, 1988, 1989, 1990, 1991, 1993, 1994, 1995, 1996, 1997, 1998, 2001, 2002, 2003, 2004, 2005, 2006, 2007, 2008, 2009, 2011, 2013, 2014, 2015, 2016, 2017
 Greek Christmas Cup: 19
 1992, 1994, 1995, 1996, 1997, 1998, 1999, 2001, 2002, 2003, 2005, 2006, 2007, 2008, 2013, 2014, 2015, 2016, 2018
 Greek Championship of South Greece: 6
 1931, 1932, 1933, 1934, 1935, 1939
 Greek Championship of Center: 4
 1961, 1966, 1967, 1968
 Greek Championship of young girls: 10
 1951, 1958, 1963, 1969, 1971, 1972, 1983, 1998, 2009, 2013
 Greek Championship of teenagers: 15
 1934, 1937, 1952, 1958, 1961, 1964, 1969, 1972, 1975, 1984, 1986, 1989, 1995, 1999, 2000
 Greek Championship of maidens: 11
 1947, 1951, 1958, 1962, 1967, 1974, 1978, 1979, 1981, 1988, 1999
 Winter Greek Championship of South Greece maidens: 1
 2013

Youth Department 
 International Meeting 
Winners (3): 1970, 1972, 1973
 Runners-up (1): 1971

European Honours

Diving Department 
The Diving Department has won numerous Greek championships since 1958.

Diving honours
 Greek Championship: 9
 1961, 1962, 1963, 1964, 1965, 1966, 1967, 1970, 1971.

External links 

 https://web.archive.org/web/20081120144508/http://www.sport.gov.gr/

References

Swimming
Swimming in Greece
Swimming clubs